Pascal Di Tommaso (born 10 August 1954) is a French former professional footballer who played as a midfielder.

Early and personal life
Born in Grenoble, Di Tommaso is the brother of fellow player Louis Di Tommaso. His sons David and Yohan were also footballers.

Career
Di Tommaso played for Grenoble Foot 38.

References

1954 births
Living people
French footballers
Grenoble Foot 38 players
Ligue 1 players
Sportspeople from Grenoble
Association football midfielders
Footballers from Auvergne-Rhône-Alpes